A ridgeway (road) is a road or path that follows a ridge, or the highest part of the landscape.

Roads and pathways
The Ridgeway, an ancient track in southern England, which now forms part of the Ridgeway Path or National Trail
Ridgeway (London), a 19th-century path running along central and southeast London
Wessex Ridgeway, an extension of the Ridgeway Path to the south west

Places
Australia
Ridgeway, Tasmania

Canada
Ridgeway, Ontario
Battle of Ridgeway in 1866

England
Ridgeway, Bristol
Ridgeway, Derbyshire
Ridgeway, Gloucestershire is now called Rudgeway
Ridgeway, Staffordshire
Ridgeway View, Wiltshire

Wales
Ridgeway, Newport

South Africa
 Ridgeway, Gauteng

United States
Ridgeway, Alaska
Ridgeway, Colorado
Ridgeway, Georgia
Ridgeway, Iowa
Ridgeway, Kentucky
Ridgeway, Ohio
Ridgeway, Minnesota
Ridgeway, Missouri
Ridgeway, New Jersey
Ridgeway, New York
Ridgeway, North Carolina
Ridgeway, South Carolina
Ridgeway Historic District, Ridgeway, South Carolina, listed on the National Register of Historic Places
Ridgeway, Virginia
Ridgeway, Pittsylvania County, Virginia
Ridgeway, West Virginia
Ridgeway, Wisconsin
Ridgeway (town), Wisconsin
Ridgeway Township, Michigan

Zambia
Ridgeway, Lusaka

Other uses
Ridgeway (surname)
Ridgeway Clocks, a clock manufacturer in the United States
Ridgeway Radio, a hospital radio station in Dorchester, Dorset

See also
Ridgway (disambiguation)
Ridgeway House (disambiguation)
Ridgeway School (disambiguation)